Gyllene Tider was released on 18 February 1980 and is the debut studio album by Swedish pop group Gyllene Tider. The album peaked at number one on the Swedish Albums Chart and number 27 on the Norwegian Albums Chart.

As of July 1981, the album had sold 150,000 copies in Sweden since its release.

Track listing
Side A
"Skicka ett vykort, älskling" ("Send Me a Postcard") (music by R. van Leeuven)
"Himmel no. 7"
"Revolver upp"
"Flickorna på TV 2"
"(Dansar inte lika bra som) Sjömän"
"Sista gången jag såg Annie"

Side B
"Billy" (words & music: Per Gessle)
"Fån telefon"
"När ni faller faller ni hårt"
"Ska vi älska, så ska vi älska till Buddy Holly"
"Guld"

All lyrics written by Per Gessle. All music written by Per Gessle and Mats Persson if nothing else is mentioned.

Gyllene Tider on CD
Gyllene Tider has been re-released on CD twice. First time in 1990, then with three bonus tracks:
"24 December" (earlier released on Christmas compilation album Glitter, glögg & rock'n roll)
"Åh Ziggy Stardust (var blev du av?)"
"Marie i växeln"

The other re-release was a digipack-CD with the EP Gyllene Tider as bonus record.

Charts

References

1980 debut albums
Gyllene Tider albums